The Former Residence of Zuo Zongtang or Zuo Zongtang's Former Residence located in Zhangshu, Xiangyin County, Hunan, China, is the former residence of Zuo Zongtang, a statesman and military leader in the late Qing dynasty (1644–1911).

Etymology
Zuo Zongtang liked willows, which are vigorous and indomitable, so he named the house "Willow Manor" .

History
The traditional folk house was built in 1843, in the 23rd year of Daoguang period in the Qing dynasty (1644–1911). It cost 900 taels of silver. Zuo lived in the house from October 1844 to 1957, when he moved to Changsha, the capital city of Hunan province. 

The local government allocated $2 million for reconstruction in 2004. On July 27, 2010, it was listed as a National Patriotic Education Base by the Propaganda Department of the Communist Party of China.

Architecture
The entire temple faces east and consists of 48 buildings. The complex include the following halls: Willow Manor, "Guiyun" (Clouds) Pavilion, "Guihe" (tortoise and crane) Pavilion, "Fangxian" (Visiting the Sage) Pavilion, Teahouse, Zuo Zongtang Memorial Temple, Stage, etc.

Gallery

References

Traditional folk houses in Hunan
Buildings and structures in Xiangyin County
Tourist attractions in Xiangyin County
Zuo Zongtang